Otto Bookstore is an independent bookstore in Williamsport, Pennsylvania. It was founded by Alexander M. Dean in 1877. The store was named after his partner H.Y. Otto. While initially the store was located in Market Square, it later moved to West Fourth Street where it currently resides.

References 

Independent bookstores of the United States
1877 establishments in Pennsylvania